Eupithecia subexiguata is a moth in the family Geometridae. It is found in China (Shensi).

References

Moths described in 1974
subexiguata
Moths of Asia